Slipstream is the sixteenth studio album by Bonnie Raitt, released in April 2012. American Songwriter Magazine praised it as "her best album in years and one of the best of her 40-year career."

Two singles were released from the album, a cover of Gerry Rafferty's "Right Down the Line", and "Used to Rule the World", both of which charted on the Billboard Triple A chart.  The album also spawned a highly successful concert tour. The Slipstream Tour was the 82nd best-selling American tour of 2012 earning 11.3 million dollars and selling 201,313 tickets.

Critical reception
The album was listed at No. 22 on Rolling Stone's list of the top 50 albums of 2012, saying "As young stars like Adele and Katy Perry cover her songs, Raitt continues what she’s been doing, more or less, for 40-plus years."

The album won for the Grammy Award for Best Americana Album at the 2013 Grammy Awards.

Commercial performance
Debuting at No. 6 on the Billboard 200, Slipstream became Raitt's highest-charting album in 18 years. It also debuted at No. 1 on both the Rock Albums and Blues Albums charts. selling around 63,000 copies.  The album has sold 334,000 albums in the US as of January 2016.

Slipstream became the 106th best-selling album and 9th best-selling independent album in the United States in 2012.  Slipstream was also the best-selling Blues album of 2012, and Bonnie Raitt was the best-selling Blues artist of 2012.

Track listing
"Used to Rule the World" (Randall Bramblett) - 4:17
"Right Down the Line" (Gerry Rafferty) - 5:29
"Million Miles" (Bob Dylan) - 6:26
"You Can't Fail Me Now" (Loudon Wainwright III, Joseph Lee Henry) - 4:18
"Down to You" (George Marinelli, lyrics Raitt, Randall Bramblett) - 3:59 
"Take My Love with You" (Gordon Kennedy, Wayne Kirkpatrick, Kelly Price) - 4:24
"Not Cause I Wanted To" (Al Anderson, Bonnie Bishop) - 3:37
"Ain't Gonna Let You Go" (Al Anderson, Bonnie Bramlett) - 5:59
"Marriage Made in Hollywood" (Paul Brady, Michael O'Keefe) - 4:55
"Split Decision" (Anderson, Gary Nicholson) - 4:35
"Standing in the Doorway" (Bob Dylan) - 5:24
"God Only Knows" (Joseph Lee Henry) - 4:26

Personnel 
 Bonnie Raitt – lead vocals (1-12), electric slide guitar (1, 2, 3, 5, 8, 10, 11), arrangements (2), acoustic guitar (3), tambourine (10)
 Mike Finnigan – Hammond B3 organ (1, 2, 6-10), backing vocals (1), clavinet (2), acoustic piano (5), organ (5), Wurlitzer electric piano (6, 8, 9)
 Patrick Warren – acoustic piano (3, 11, 12), Wurlitzer electric piano (4), pump organ (7), keyboards (11, 12)
 Johnny Lee Schell – electric guitar (1)
 George Marinelli – electric guitar (1, 2, 5, 6, 7, 9), harmony vocals (2, 5), acoustic guitar (6, 9), backing vocals (6), shakers (8), mandolin (9)
 Bill Frisell – electric guitar (3, 4, 11)
 Greg Leisz – acoustic guitar (3, 4), pedal steel guitar (11)
 Al Anderson – acoustic guitar (6, 7, 8), lead guitar solo (7), electric guitar (10), harmony vocals (10)
 James "Hutch" Hutchinson – bass (1, 2, 5, 6, 8, 9, 10), upright bass (7)
 David Piltch – upright bass (3, 4, 11)
 Ricky Fataar – drums (1, 2, 5, 6, 8, 9, 10), timbales (2), tambourine (9, 10)
 Jay Bellerose – drums (3, 4, 11)
 Luis Conte – percussion (1, 2, 6)
 Gang – handclaps (5)
 Maia Sharp – backing vocals (2, 6, 9), harmony vocals (7)
 Jeff Young – backing vocals (6)
 Paul Brady – harmony vocals (9)

Production 
 Producers – Bonnie Raitt (Tracks 1, 2 & 5-10 ); Joe Henry (Tracks 3, 4, 11 & 12).
 Recorded and Mixed by Ryan Freeland
 Second Engineer – Wesley Seidman
 Various overdubs on Tracks 6, 7, 9, 10 & 12 recorded by Scott Baggett.
 Mixed at Stampede Origin Studio (Culver City, CA).
 Mastered by Bob Ludwig at Gateway Mastering (Portland, ME).
 Project Coordinator – Kathy Kane
 Art Direction and Design – Norman Miller and DesignartLA.com.
 Photography – Matt Mindlin
 Background Photos – Norman Miller
 Assistant Photography – Omar Gaieck and Chris Soule
 Management – Kathy Kane, assisted by Annie Heller-Gutwillig, Chloe Monahan and Mary Skerritt.
 Hair – Gunn Espegard
 Make-up – Kate Lindsay

Charts

Weekly charts

Year-end charts

Singles - Billboard (United States)

References

External links

2012 albums
Bonnie Raitt albums
Albums produced by Joe Henry
Grammy Award for Best Americana Album